Pablo Ramirez may refer to:

Pablo Ramirez (skateboarder) (1993–2019)
Pablo Ramírez, Mexican Spanish-language sportscaster